Korhogo cloth is an African textile made by the Senufo people of Korhogo, Ivory Coast. Often described as being in the shadows of bogolafini (mud cloth) and kente, korhogo comes in neutral and earthy tones like browns, blacks and creams.  Korhogo is made by hand painting designs on hand woven and hand spun cotton fabric. The paintings are done using a specially fermented mud-based and natural vegetal pigment that darkens over time, and designs are usually drawn on using a stencil. They are decorated with symbols of humans, natural elements like the sun, moon and stars and animals, all of which are rooted in Senufo culture and mythology. The Senufo use the cloth as a shield against vengeful spirits by wearing or hanging them in homes/shrines. Korhogo  is commissioned for hunters (important heroic figures) and rite of passage events like funerals/special ceremonies.

Men and women are involved in the fabrication of the cloth. Both cultivate the cotton, the women spin the cotton into yarn and prepare the dye while men weave and decorate the cloth. Upon completion, the fabric is often used for clothing, decor and many more.

History 
This type of cloth came to being in the late 1960s and early 1970s and remains popular with tourists and urban Ivorians today. Eager to sustain Senufo traditions and help expand the local market, American Peace Corps volunteers encouraged the people to explore new means of clothing production. Fila cloth consisted of six stripes of cotton cloth that had been sewn together and served as the prototype for which korhogo was built upon. Fila is mostly decorated with hand painted stripes as its primary motif and zig-zag designs symbolic of the leopard. To preserve fila's traditional characteristics, Korhogo cloth producers continued to use hand spun cotton strips woven by their Dyula neighbors. However, unlike fila, Korhogo cloth quickly became the canvas onto which cloth producers painted a large variety of imagery derived from the local society and culture. The earliest examples of Korhogo cloth have fila strips which were used as the grid where visual motifs would be painted. When the Grahams had coveted the cloth by the early 1980s, the Senufo cloth makers had abandoned the strips and used the entire cloth to frame the painted motifs.

Symbolic meanings 
There are over 80 motifs created by the makers of korhogo cloth and they create a story on the cloth when combined. Some popular symbols:
 Guinea fowl: feminine beauty
 Chicken: Maternity
 Goat: Male prowess
 Trees: Sacred wood where Poro societies met
 Chameleon: Death
 Fish: Life and water
 Fish bones: Drought
 Lion: Royal power
 Hunter: Mysteries of the forest
 Swallow: Trust
 Crocodile and the Lizard: Male Fertility
 Snake and the Turtle: Earth
 Sun, Moon and Stars: The first elements God created

See also 
Korhogo

Senufo People

References 

Korhogo
Woven fabrics
African clothing
Ivorian culture
Textile arts of Africa